Dedushkin is a rural locality (a selo) in Kharabali, Kharabalinsky District, Astrakhan Oblast, Russia. The population was 23 as of 2010.

Geography
Dedushkin is located on the Volga River, 20 km west of Kharabali (the district's administrative centre) by road. Yekaterinovka is the nearest rural locality.

References

Rural localities in Kharabalinsky District